Preston is a rural locality in the Whitsunday Region, Queensland, Australia. The town of Bonavista is within the south of the locality.

History 
The town of Bonavista was originally called Conway, which was derived from Cape Conway, which was named on 3 June 1770 by Lieutenant James Cook, commander of HMS Endeavour, after British Secretary of State for the Southern Department, Henry Seymour Conway. The town was renamed Bonavista from 3 January 1961. However, the road to the town is still called Conway Road.

References

External links 

 Town map of Bonavista, 1970

Whitsunday Region
Localities in Queensland